Hope Fairfield-Shanowski  is a fictional character on the ABC sitcom Hope & Faith.

Overview
Born as Hope Fairfield, to Jack Fairfield and Mary Fairfield . 
She lost her virginity to Randy Richter, somebody she used to date . She regrets it and wishes she had lost it instead to Charley Shanowski, Her husband. Hope is the matriarch of the family. She is usually the most sensible one, and is always reluctant to go along with her sister, Faith's schemes.
She is married to Charlie and has 3 kids, Sydney, Hayley, and Justin. She likes to bake and garden. Faith Fairfield is Hope's sister and a soap opera star whose character was killed off, leading her to move in with Hope's family. In the middle of season 2 Hope starts a catering business with Faith and calls her business, 'Hope and Faith caterers' . But in one episode she makes it 'Hope and Grace caterers' because Faith took a job as a weather forecaster.

Fictional characters from Ohio
Fictional housewives
Sitcom characters
Television characters introduced in 2003